Niedźwiady  (German: Ulrikenhof, until 1907: Niedzwiady) is a village in the administrative district of Gmina Jaraczewo, within Jarocin County, Greater Poland Voivodeship, in west-central Poland.

References 

Villages in Jarocin County